Rusnė is a border town in Šilutė district, Lithuania, located on the Rusnė Island in the Nemunas Delta, 9 km south-west from Šilutė.

History
Rusnė was first mentioned in historical sources in the 14th century. In 1419 the first church was built in Rusnė, and in 1553 a Lithuanian parish school was established. In 1863 the Rusnė synagogue opened.

In 1946 Rusnė received municipal rights, and in 1967 the whole Island of Rusnė was given this status.

Geography
Some parts of the town of Rusnė near Lake Dumblė are located below the sea level  and are the lowest in Lithuania.

Rusnė is on the Russian border, which is marked by the Skirvytė river.

Tourism
Rusnė town and Rusnė island is very popular place for angling, as Nemunas delta is rich in various kinds of fish, and tourism infrastructure is built up in recent years. It is also a popular place for birdwatching.

Kursenieki

While today the Kursenieki, also known as Kuršininkai are a nearly extinct Baltic ethnic group living along the Curonian Spit, in 1649 Kuršininkai settlement spanned from Memel (Klaipėda) to Danzig (Gdańsk), including in the area of the Nemunas Delta. The Kuršininkai were eventually assimilated by the Germans, except along the Curonian Spit where some still live. The Kuršininkai were considered Latvians until after World War I when Latvia gained independence from the Russian Empire, a consideration based on linguistic arguments. This was the rationale for Latvian claims over the Curonian Spit, Memel, and other territories of East Prussia which would be later dropped.

Notable residents
 Heinrich Ancker (1850-1900), member of the Reichstag
 Gerhard Gregor (1906–1981), musician
 Rudolf Jenett (1914–1998), majorgeneral of the Bundeswehr
 Hermann Kallenbach (1871-1945) architect
 Charlotte Keyser (1890-1966), writer
 Otto D. Tolischus (1890–1967), journalist

Image gallery

References

Towns in Lithuania
Towns in Klaipėda County
Rusnė Island